National Institute of Unani Medicine (NIUM) is an autonomous organization for research and training in Unani medicine in India. It was established in 1984 at Bangalore under the Department of Ayurveda, Yoga and Naturopathy, Unani, Siddha and Homoeopathy (AYUSH), Ministry of Health and Family Welfare, Govt. of India, in a joint venture with Government of Karnataka.

Academic activities were started in the year 2004. 

It is affiliated to Rajiv Gandhi University of Health Sciences, (RGUHS), Bangalore, Karnataka and offers post graduate courses (MD in Unani) in ten different subjects 
 Moalajat (general Medicine), 
 Ilmul Advia (Pharmacology), 
 Tahaffuzi wa Samaji Tib (Preventive and Social medicine), 
 Ilmul Qabalat wa Amraze Niswan (Obstetrics & Gynaecology), 
 Ilmul Saidla (Pharmacy), 
 Ilmul Jrahat (Surgery), 
 Ilaj bit Tadbeereer (Regiminal therapy), 
 Kulliyat (Basic Principles), 
 Mahiyatul Amraz (Pathology) and 
 Amraze Jild wa Mafasil (Dermatology and Rheumatology).

See also
 Central Research Institute of Unani Medicine

References

External links
 National Institute of Unani Medicine, Official website

Research institutes in Bangalore
Unani medicine organisations
Ministry of AYUSH
1984 establishments in Karnataka
Research institutes established in 1984